Kaye Michelle Wragg (born 15 December 1972) is an English actress best known for her television roles as Sergeant Diane Noble in The Bill, Kate Oakley in No Angels, Essie Harrison (now known as Essie di Lucca) in Holby City from 2014 to 2020 and Lucy Archer in The Lakes. She studied at the University of Salford.

Career
Born in Stockport, Cheshire, Wragg played one of Nick Harper's girlfriends, a police officer, in the BBC One situation comedy My Family. She played nurse Essie di Lucca in Holby City whose first appearance was on 6 May 2014, she made her final appearance as Essie Di Lucca in Episode 1033, broadcast on 11 August 2020, as a conclusion of the character's terminal cancer storyline. She also played Gina in ITV's Panto! for the one Christmas special episode. In 2014 she guest starred in the first two episodes of series 17 of Silent Witness. Wragg was also a main role in the Channel 4 hospital comedy No Angels

In 2015 Wragg appeared as Izzy Cartwright in the BBC TV series Death in Paradise Series 4 Episode 7.

Personal life
Having been together for 14 years, Wragg married Jamie Darling at Tatton Park, Cheshire, on 17 November 2007. They have two daughters, Matilda and Mollie.

References

External links
 
 Kaye Wragg"—UnitedAgents.co.uk

1972 births
Alumni of the University of Salford
English television actresses
Living people
Actors from Stockport